Bare Fists (also known as The Man Who Wouldn’t Shoot)   is a 1919 American Western film directed by John Ford and featuring Harry Carey. It is considered to be a lost film.

John Ford and actor Harry Carey collaborated on at least 25 films in the years of 1917-1921. During these collaborations, Carey made more per film than Ford. By 1919 Ford was making 300 dollars a week, Carey was making 1,250.  This differential in pay led to tension between the two.

Plot
The film takes place in a lawless town in southwestern Kansas during the era of outlaws and cowboys.  After the marshal is killed while breaking up a saloon fight, his son, Cheyenne Harry avenges his father’s death by killing two of the men involved.  His mother pleads with him to never carry a gun again and Cheyenne Harry agrees.

Harry is wooing the beautiful Conchita.  Conchita is also being wooed by the devious Boone Travis. In order to eliminate his rival, Travis murders a man and frames Harry.  Harry is sentenced to die, but is allowed one last visit to see his mother.
During this trip he is told that his brother Bud was attacked and branded by cattle thieves.  Harry escapes custody and punishes the men who attacked his brother.  He is also cleared of the charge of murder.

Cast
 Harry Carey as Cheyenne Harry
 Betty Schade as Conchita
 Joe Harris as Boone Travis
 Vester Pegg as Lopez
 Mollie McConnell as Conchita's Mother (as Molly McConnell)
 Anna Mae Walthall as Ruby (as Anna May Walthall)
 Howard Enstedt as Bud
 Joseph W. Girard as Harry's Father (as Joseph Girard)

See also
 List of American films of 1919
 Harry Carey filmography
 John Ford filmography
 List of lost films

References

External links
 

1919 films
1919 Western (genre) films
1919 lost films
American black-and-white films
Films directed by John Ford
Films with screenplays by Bernard McConville
Lost Western (genre) films
Lost American films
Universal Pictures films
Silent American Western (genre) films
1910s American films
1910s English-language films